Megasurcula rara is an extinct species of sea snail, a marine gastropod mollusk in the family Pseudomelatomidae, the turrids and allies.

Distribution
Fossils of this marine species have been found in Neogene strata in Japan.

References

 Nomura, S. and H. Onisi, 1940, Neogene Mollusca from the Sennan District, Miyagi Prefecture, Japan; Jap. Jour. Geol. Geogr:, vol. XVII, nos. 3--4,pp. 181–194, pls XVII-XIX.

rara
Gastropods described in 1940